Auckland Transport (AT) is the council-controlled organisation (CCO) of Auckland Council responsible for transport projects and services. It was established by section 38 of the Local Government (Auckland Council) Act 2009, and operates under that act and the Local Government (Auckland Transitional Provisions) Act 2010.

Auckland Transport began operating from 1 November 2010, at the inauguration of Auckland Council. It assumed the role of the Auckland Regional Transport Authority (ARTA) and the combined transport functions of Auckland's seven city and district councils, all of which were disestablished.

Operations and staff 

AT is responsible for the Auckland Region's transport infrastructure (excluding state highways and railway tracks) and public transport. It designs, builds and maintains roads, ferry wharves, cycleways and walkways; co-ordinates road safety and community transport initiatives; and it plans, co-ordinates and funds bus, train and ferry services. It is the largest of the council's organisations, with over 1700 staff, controlling half of all council rates. Dr David Warburton was the inaugural chief executive of the organisation. His successor, Shane Ellison, joined the organisation in December 2017.

Auckland Transport appoints parking wardens to fulfil its responsibility of parking and special vehicle lane enforcement in the region. In 2017, it created the new position of Transport Officer, in response to issues regarding fare-evasion and disorderly behavior on public transport. Transport Officers are empowered by law to remove passengers off trains and issue infringement notices of $150 to enforce fare payment.

Board members 
Directors are appointed by Cabinet and by Auckland Council. The Board has overall responsibility for delivering transport, including managing and controlling public transport and local roads.

The directors appointed from October 2019 were:
 Adrienne Young-Cooper (Chair)
 Wayne Donnelly (Deputy Chair)
 Darren Linton
 Kylie Clegg
 Mary-Jane Daly
 Jim Mather
 Dame Paula Rebstock
 Nicole Rosie
 Councillor Bill Cashmore
 Councillor Chris Darby

Assets 
AT's assets totalled $19.1 billion in 2018, up 0.5 billion since June 2017. AT owned or operated the following transport assets as of 2018:

57 electric train sets, consisting of AM class multiple units per set
41 railway station facilities (shelters, conveniences, WiFi) on Auckland's four railway lines, but not the platforms or tracks, which are owned by KiwiRail
16 dedicated bus stations, including six on the Northern Busway
21 ferry facilities
7,452 km of arterial and local roads (excluding state highways in the Auckland region, which are owned and maintained by NZ Transport Agency)

Also the following:
6,859 km of footpaths, which grew to 7,287 km by 2016
985 bridges and major culverts
99,912 street lights
127,666 road signs
1,554 bus shelters
14 multi-storey car park buildings
933 on-street pay-and-display machines
270 AIFS integrated ticketing devices

See also
 Public transport in Auckland
 AT Metro
 AT HOP card
 Hinaki Eel Trap Bridge

References

External links

Auckland Transport website

Transport in Auckland
Politics of the Auckland Region
Municipally owned companies
Public transport in Auckland
Auckland Council